Oncinotis is a genus of plant in the family Apocynaceae, first described as a genus in 1849. It is native to  Africa, including Madagascar.  the World Checklist of Selected Plant Families recognises 7 species:

Species
 Oncinotis glabrata (Baill.) Stapf ex Hiern - tropical Africa from Liberia to Tanzania, south to Angola
 Oncinotis gracilis Stapf - tropical Africa from Liberia to Central African Republic, south to Angola
 Oncinotis hirta Oliv. - C Africa from Cameroon to Angola
 Oncinotis nitida Benth. - W Africa from Liberia to Republic of Congo
 Oncinotis pontyi Dubard - tropical Africa from Guinea to Uganda
 Oncinotis tenuiloba Stapf - C + S Africa from Nigeria east to Sudan + Ethiopia, south to Cape Province
 Oncinotis tomentella Radlk. - Madagascar

formerly included
 Oncinotis axillaris K.Schum. = Baissea multiflora A.DC.  
 Oncinotis campanulata K.Schum = Baissea campanulata (K.Schum.) de Kruif 
 Oncinotis melanocephala K.Schum. = Baissea myrtifolia (Benth.) Pichon 
 Oncinotis subsessilis K.Schum. = Baissea campanulata (K.Schum.) de Kruif 
 Oncinotis zygodioides K.Schum. = Baissea zygodioides (K.Schum.) Stapf

References

 
Apocynaceae genera
Flora of Africa